Conus asiaticus is a species of sea snail, a marine gastropod mollusk in the family Conidae, the cone snails and their allies.

Like all species within the genus Conus, these snails are predatory and venomous. They are capable of "stinging" humans, therefore live ones should be handled carefully or not at all.

There is one subspecies: Conus asiaticus lovellreevei G. Raybaudi Massilia, 1993 (synonym: Conus lovellreevei G. Raybaudi Massilia, 1993).

Description
The size of an adult shell varies between 35 mm and 52 mm.

Distribution
This marine species occurs in the Pacific Ocean off the Philippines and Japan and in the South China Sea off Vietnam.

References

 Filmer R.M. (2001). A Catalogue of Nomenclature and Taxonomy in the Living Conidae 1758 – 1998. Backhuys Publishers, Leiden. 388pp
 Tucker J.K. (2009). Recent cone species database. September 4, 2009 Edition
 Tucker J.K. & Tenorio M.J. (2009) Systematic classification of Recent and fossil conoidean gastropods. Hackenheim: Conchbooks. 296 pp.
 Puillandre N., Duda T.F., Meyer C., Olivera B.M. & Bouchet P. (2015). One, four or 100 genera? A new classification of the cone snails. Journal of Molluscan Studies. 81: 1–23

Gallery
Conus asiaticus lovellreevei

External links
 The Conus Biodiversity website
 
 Cone Shells – Knights of the Sea

asiaticus
Gastropods described in 1985